Anna Ammirati (born January 1, 1979) is an Italian actress.

Career
After finishing a liceo artistico in Campania, Ammirati moved to Rome to study psychology. In the meantime, she also had minor acting roles starting with the miniseries Positano and in 1997, she applied at a casting session at Cinecittà organised by director Tinto Brass to find the lead actress for Monella. Her greatest success came with this early role but like many other Brass finds, her later career was of much lower profile.

Ammirati lives in London but she has been active on the Italian acting scene with cinematic films as well as TV series such as Io e mio figlio - Nuove storie per il commissario Vivaldi.

References

External links

1979 births
Living people
Italian film actresses
Italian television actresses
Actresses from Naples
Italian expatriates in England